István Antal Szívós, also known as István Szívós Jr. (24 April 1948 – 10 November 2019) was a Hungarian water polo player. He competed in four consecutive Olympics in 1968–1980 and won a medal in each of them, becoming one of eight male athletes who won four or more Olympic medals in water polo. He also won six gold or silver medals at world and European championships and nine national titles. Between 1966 and 1980 he played 308 international matches for Hungary. In 1996 he was inducted to the International Swimming Hall of Fame, one year earlier than his father István Sr., who won Olympic gold medals in water polo in 1952 and 1956.

Szívós graduated from the Medical University in Budapest, where he later worked as a dentist. After retiring from competitions in 1980 he also became a water polo coach and president of Ferencvárosi TC, and served as a board member of the Hungarian Water Polo Federation.

Personal life
His son Márton is also world champion and his father István was also Olympic champion in water polo. He died 10 November 2019 at the age of 71.

See also
 Hungary men's Olympic water polo team records and statistics
 List of multiple Olympic medalists in one event
 List of Olympic champions in men's water polo
 List of Olympic medalists in water polo (men)
 List of players who have appeared in multiple men's Olympic water polo tournaments
 List of world champions in men's water polo
 List of World Aquatics Championships medalists in water polo
 List of members of the International Swimming Hall of Fame

References

External links

 

1948 births
2019 deaths
Water polo players from Budapest
Hungarian male water polo players
Olympic water polo players of Hungary
Water polo players at the 1968 Summer Olympics
Water polo players at the 1972 Summer Olympics
Water polo players at the 1976 Summer Olympics
Water polo players at the 1980 Summer Olympics
Olympic gold medalists for Hungary
Olympic silver medalists for Hungary
Olympic bronze medalists for Hungary
Olympic medalists in water polo
Medalists at the 1980 Summer Olympics
Medalists at the 1976 Summer Olympics
Medalists at the 1972 Summer Olympics
Medalists at the 1968 Summer Olympics
Hungarian water polo coaches
20th-century Hungarian people
21st-century Hungarian people